The Queen's County Ossory, by-election, 1886 was a parliamentary by-election held for the United Kingdom House of Commons constituency of Queen's County Ossory on 12 February 1886. Arthur O'Connor of the Irish Parliamentary Party, member for the former Queen's County constituency, having been elected both in this seat and in East Donegal, chose to sit for the latter. The Queen's County Ossory seat thus became vacant, requiring a by-election. Only one candidate, Stephen O'Mara of the Irish Parliamentary Party, was nominated, and was elected unopposed. He held the seat until the general election later that year, which he did not contest.

References

1886 elections in the United Kingdom
February 1886 events
By-elections to the Parliament of the United Kingdom in Queen's County constituencies
Unopposed by-elections to the Parliament of the United Kingdom in Irish constituencies
1886 elections in Ireland